

Reservoirs
Maharana Pratap Sagar
Pandoh Lake
Gobind Sagar
Chamera Dam

Low Altitude Lakes
Renuka Lake
Macchial Lake

Mid Altitude Lakes

Dal Lake District kangra 
Khajjiar Lake District Chamba
Kumarwah Lake District Mandi 
Rewalsar Lake District mandi

High Altitude Lakes
Prashar Lake (2730m)- Mandi district
Dehnasar Lake (4280m) -Kangra district 
Nako Lake (3662m) - Kinnaur district 
Chandra Tal (4300m) -Lahaul & Spiti district 
Suraj Tal (4883m) -Lahaul & Spiti district 
Dhankar Lake
Dashair (4270m)
Bhrighu Lake (4235m) - Kullu district 
Manimahesh Lake (4080m) -Chamba district 
Gadasru Lake (3470m) - Chamba district 
Mahakali Lake (4080m) -Chamba district 
Lama Dal (3960m) -Chamba district 
Chander Naun (4260m)
Kareri Lake (2934m) -Kangra district 
Nag Dal Lake (4150m)
Kamrunag lake (3334m) Mandi in district.mandi
In the Shimla area lie the small rain water fed lakes of Tani Jubbar, Kunihar and Karwali that lies of the Choti Shali Peak. There are several natural ponds in the area-one lies below New Shimla and there is another between Mashobra and Carignano.

References

External links

Himachal Pradesh Tourism Dep. of India

Himachal Pradesh
 
Lakes